Christmas candle may refer to:

 Advent candle, Christian religious candles used during the Advent season up to Christmas Eve
 Christingle candles
 Christmas decoration candle lights, lights in the form of candles used as decorations for Christmas, see Christmas lights
 The Christmas Candle (2013 film) UK-U.S. Christmas film
 The Christmas Candle (book) (2013 novel) Christmas novel by Max Lucado

See also
 Hanukkah candles, see Hanukkah and Menorah (Hanukkah)
 Christmas (disambiguation)
 Candle (disambiguation)